Dashyu Ratnakar (1962) is an Ollywood /Oriya film directed by Prabhat Mukherjee.

Synopsis
Dasyu Ratnakar kills travelers for the support and maintenance of his family. When suggested by Narad Muni to enquire his family members i.e. his father, mother, wife and children if they would receive some portions of his vice which he had done for their maintenance, Ratnakar is astonished by their replies. They all replied that it is his (Ratnakar's) duty to maintain his family. They are not responsible for the method by which Ratnakar earns money. At that reply, Ratnakar was deeply shocked, promised to shun all his vices and achieved sage-hood through deep penance.

Cast
 Prashant Nanda
 Sarat Pujari
 Shanti

References

External links
 

1962 films
1960s Odia-language films